European Marketing Distribution (EMD) is a European purchasing organization for grocery stores. EMD was established in 1989 and is based in Switzerland.

EMD is currently active in 20 countries with 55,000 points of sale. It has 13 members and has a European market share of 14%.

Affiliations

Current Affiliations

Former Affiliations

Affiliation Unclear

See also 
 Associated Marketing Services

References

External links 
EMD AG, official website

Cooperatives in Europe